The 1970 European Espoirs Wrestling Championships was the first edition of European Espoirs Wrestling Championships  was held from 17 April to 23 August 1970 in Huskvarna, Sweden.

Medal table

Medal summary

Men's freestyle

Men's Greco-Roman

References

External links 
 UWW Database

Wrestling
European Espoirs Wrestling Championships
W
Euro